Harry "Doc" Bundy (born January 25, 1946) from Scio, Ohio, is an American former race car driver who competed in IMSA (International Motor Sports Association), 24 Hours of Le Mans, NASCAR Rolex Grand-Am Sports Car Series, American Le Mans Series, USRRC, and SCCA World Challenge.

Race History

Bundy's motorsports career began as a wheel polisher and technician for famed Porsche driver Peter Gregg in 1973.  The following year, he moved to Al Holbert Racing, where he spent the next five years preparing cars.  In 1980, Bundy began driving for Holbert Racing in a Porsche 924, capturing a National Championship as a rookie.  He followed that by driving a Porsche 924 Turbo and took a class win in the GTO Category at the 24 Hours of LeMans.  Over the next few years, he would drive for Lotus, Jaguar, Ford, and Chevrolet (Corvette), topped with a season racing a Porsche 962.  Bundy shared driving duties in the Hendrick Motorsports IMSA Chevrolet Corvette GTP with Sarel Van Der Merwe from 1986 through the 1988 season when Hendrick abandoned the Corvette project.  He was involved in a serious crash with Lyn St. James and Chip Robinson at the 1986 Riverside Grand Prix.

In the early 1990s, Bundy drove the Esprit X180R for Lotus as the team's number one driver in IMSA's Bridgestone Supercar Championship, winning the Driver's Title and Manufacturer's Championship for Lotus in 1992.  Lotus teammates Andy Pilgrim and David Murry featured prominently in the standings, with additional varied drivers that included Paul Newman.

Bundy drove in the 1997 24 Hours of Le Mans in a David Price Racing Panoz Esperante GTR-1.  He currently drives Lotus Elite, Lotus 23B, and 1978–79 John Player Special (Car #1) for Regogo Racing Team.

Retirement

After the collapse of the Bridgestone Supercar Championship, Bundy became a TV announcer.  He continued to drive, instruct, consult, and act as a spokesperson for Lotus, Panoz, and Porsche.  In 2011 he signed with Paul Rego at a vintage Lotus racing team named Regogo Racing as their driver in Regogo's first professional season, Doc has become an award-winning driver for Regogo and his future continues to look bright in his retirement years.  An avid historic racer, Doc Drives a Lotus 23b, and Mario Andretti's 1979 John Player Special which Paul Rego purchased and restored in 2011.  It made its debut at Barber Motorsports Park in 2012. Doc has been driving for Regogo Racing since 2011 and continues to enjoy many first-place finishes.

In January 2020, Doc was hospitalized with the COVID-19 virus and subsequently underwent heart surgery to repair damage caused by the virus.

In 2021 Doc is recovering from his illness and is back to racing for Regogo.

Racing record

IMSA Bridgestone Supercar Championship

24 Hours of Le Mans

 1982
 1984
 1987
 1997
 1998

SCCA National Championship Runoffs

References

 https://www.racingsportscars.com/driver/photo/Doc-Bundy-USA.html

External links
Driver Database
Regogo Racing
Facebook

1946 births
American Le Mans Series drivers
24 Hours of Le Mans drivers
Trans-Am Series drivers
Living people
People from Harrison County, Ohio
Racing drivers from Ohio
World Sportscar Championship drivers
SCCA National Championship Runoffs winners
24 Hours of Daytona drivers
Jaguar Racing drivers
David Price Racing drivers